The InterVarsity Choral Festival (IVCF) is an annual event in which university choirs from Ontario and Quebec, Canada, meet up and perform a combined concert. The festival is hosted and held on a rotational basis by the member choirs. In 1991, IVCF was hosted by McMaster University in Hamilton, Ontario. In 2007, IVCF was hosted by the University of Western Ontario Choir in London, Ontario. In 2008, the University of Ottawa hosted the event. In 2009, the Hart House Chorus (at the University of Toronto)  hosted the event. In 2011, The University of Western Ontario Choir hosted IVCF.

History of Canadian IVCF 
The InterVarsity Choral Festival was founded in 1949 by the NFCUS (National Federation of Canadian University Students) who suggested that there be a regular competitive music festival in Ontario. The solution was a yearly festival of university choirs. The original participants were McMaster University (Mac), the University of Western Ontario (UWO) and University of Toronto's Victoria College. Ontario Agricultural College, Guelph, joined two years later.

By 1980, the festival had undergone some major changes. Toronto's Hart House Chorus and the Queens Choral Ensemble were now permanent participants while Guelph had dropped out. The competition was restructured into an adjudicated, non-competitive two-day festival, and Mary Willan Mason, a noted Toronto writer and daughter of Healey Willan, donated a cup to be presented to the host choir to recognise their efforts in organising the festival.

Members of Canadian IVCF

Current members
 Hart House Chorus, University of Toronto
 Queen's Choral Ensemble, Queen's University
 Simply Sweetly, McGill University
 Trent University Concert Choir, Trent University
 University of Western Ontario Choir, University of Western Ontario
 Ensemble Calixa Lavallée, University of Ottawa
 University of Ottawa Choral Ensemble, University of Ottawa

Past members
 McMaster University Choir, McMaster University
 Ontario Agricultural College Union Philharmonic Choral Society, Ontario Agricultural College
 Polyhymnia, Queen's University
 Trinity Glee Club, University of Toronto
 University of Guelph Chorus, University of Guelph
 University of Toronto Chorus, University of Toronto
 University of Waterloo Choir, University of Waterloo
 Victoria College Choir, University of Toronto

References

External links 
 Inter-Varsity Choral Festival - 2009 Gala Concert, Metropolitan United Church, Canada, February 1, 2009.
Inter Varsity Choral Festival (Australia)

Recurring events established in 1949
Music festivals in Ontario
Choral festivals
Music festivals in Quebec